Hand Clappin, Foot Stompin, Funky-Butt ... Live! is a live album by Geno Washington & the Ram Jam Band, released around December 1966.

Background
It was an attempt to capture the atmosphere of the group's live stage show. Straight away it registered in the UK charts, peaking at number five and staying in the top ten for three months. It was still in the Top 40 in July the following year.  For three years the album remained the biggest selling album for Pye Records.
In the United States, it was a Special Merit pick in the March 4, 1967 issue of Billboard.

Track listing

References

1966 live albums
1966 debut albums
Pye Records albums